St Margaret's Church is an Anglican church in Wolstanton, Staffordshire, England, and in the Diocese of Lichfield. The building is Grade II* listed.

Description
The Domesday Book of 1086 mentions Wolstanton, and records that the village had a priest. Some of the building dates from the medieval period; the tower and octagonal spire, which, unusually, is on the north side, is on medieval foundations.

The church is in decorated style. There was rebuilding in 1623; the church was substantially rebuilt in 1860, by Ward and Son, the chancel being designed by Anthony Salvin.

Interior
The nave has arcades of four bays, and a hammerbeam roof. The chancel screen has wood tracery.

There are monuments in the chancel to the Sneyd family, in particular an alabaster chest tomb of the 16th century, in memory of Sir William Sneyd and his wife Anne; their recumbent effigies lie on the tomb. There are wall tablets in memory of other members of the family.

Bells
There are eight bells; six of them, cast in 1714, were originally in a church in Trentham, and installed at St Margaret's in 1767.

Churchyard
The grave of Henry Faulds (1843–1930), missionary and developer of fingerprinting, is in the churchyard.

The churchyard also contains the grave of Sarah Smith, who died in 1763 aged 21. The inscription alleges that she was murdered by poisoning, and suggests the name of the man responsible. The grave is Grade II listed.

References

Grade II* listed churches in Staffordshire
Church of England church buildings in Staffordshire
Diocese of Lichfield